The 1912–13 season was Madrid Football Club's 11th season in existence. The club played some friendly matches. They also played in the Campeonato Regional de Madrid (Madrid Regional Championship) and the Copa del Rey.

Summary
 31 October 1912: The Campo de O'Donnell was inaugurated and became Madrid FC's home stadium. Two days later, the headline of Spanish daily ABC read: "The match between Sporting de Irún and said Society [Madrid FC] was held at Madrid's field and was a booming success. Sporting Club is one of the best teams to visit Madrid. They pass very well and have a beautiful aerial game. Perhaps they missed the sandy pitch. Madrid deserve the most profound congratulations for drawing against a team as fine as Sporting.

Friendlies

Trofeo Ciudad Lineal
The Trofeo Ciudad Lineal was held in the context of a sports festival organized by the director of the Velodrome.

Competitions

Overview

Campeonato Regional de Madrid

League table

Matches

Copa del Rey

Campeonato de España de Segundos Equipos
The Royal Spanish Football Federation organized a national championship for second teams of clubs. Seven teams entered the Madrid qualifying phase. Madrid FC's second team was seeded directly to the semifinals.

Notes

References

External links
Realmadrid.com Official Site
1912–13 Squad
1912–13 (Campeonato de Madrid)
International Friendlies of Real Madrid CF - Overview

Real Madrid
Real Madrid CF seasons